The Thomas J. Bannan Center for Science and Engineering, or simply Bannan Center, is a building complex on the Seattle University campus, in the U.S. state of Washington. The building has separate wings for engineering and science. Previously, the two fields were housed in separate buildings called the Engineering Building and the Thomas J. Bannan Center, which have since been joined.

The building houses Bannan Auditorium and Wyckoff Auditorium.

References

Buildings and structures in Seattle
Seattle University campus